Lotto Arena is an arena in Antwerp, Belgium. It has a seating capacity for 8,050 people for concerts and 5,218 for sporting events. The arena opened on March 10, 2007, after nine months of construction. It is located in the district of Merksem, adjacent to the Sportpaleis.

The Antwerp Giants basketball club uses the arena as its home venue. It also hosts the European Open, a tennis tournament part of the ATP World Tour 250 series.

See also
List of indoor arenas in Belgium

References

External links

Official site

Basketball venues in Belgium
Indoor arenas in Belgium
Boxing venues in Belgium
Sports venues in Antwerp Province
Sport in Antwerp
Buildings and structures in Antwerp